The following is a list of notable people associated with the University of Ceylon (1942–52), University of Ceylon, Peradeniya (1952–72) and University of Ceylon, Colombo (1967–1972).

Chancellors

Vice-Chancellors

Academics
 V. Appapillai – Dean of the Faculty of Science
 S. Arasaratnam – lecturer of history
 K. S. Arulnandhy – lecturer in education
 Chandra de Silva
 K. M. de Silva – chair of Sri Lanka history
 Doric de Souza – senior lecturer in English
 Brendon Gooneratne – Head of the Department of Parasitology
 H. A. I. Goonetileke – assistant librarian
 Betty Heimann – first Head of the Department of Sanskrit 
 K. Indrapala – Department of History
 Valentine Joseph – professor of mathematics.
 Stanley Kalpage – Head of the Department of Agricultural Chemistry
 P. Kanagasabapathy – professor of mathematics
 R. Kanagasuntheram – lecturer in anatomy
 K. Kanapathypillai – Head of the Department of Tamil
 K. Kunaratnam
 E. F. C. Ludowyk – Dean of the Faculty of Arts
 Baku Mahadeva – lecturer in mathematics
 Muhammad Ajward Macan Markar – professor of medicine
 A. W. Mailvaganam – Dean of the Faculty of Science
 T. Nadaraja – Dean of the Faculty of Law
 S. Pathmanathan – lecturer in history
 E. O. E. Pereira – Dean of the Faculty of Engineering
 Ediriweera Sarachchandra – lecturer in Pali
 S. Selvanayagam – assistant lecturer
 V. Sivalingam – professor of parasitology
 M. Sivasuriya – faculty of medicine
 Stanley Jeyaraja Tambiah
 A. Thurairajah – professor of civil engineering
 S. Vithiananthan – Head of the Department of Tamil
 A. Jeyaratnam Wilson – chair of political science

Alumni

Academia

 Ameer Ali – lecturer in economics
 Sarath Amunugama – professor of French; vice-chancellor of the University of Kelaniya
 S. Arulkumaran – professor of obstetrics and gynaecology
 S. Arasaratnam – professor of history
 K. Arulanandan – professor of engineering
 K. D. Arulpragasam – professor of zoology
 Ganesar Chanmugam – professor of astrophysics
 Charles Dahanayake – professor of physics, dean of Faculty of Science at the University of Kelaniya
 Chandra de Silva – lecturer in history, vice provost of the Old Dominion University
 K. M. de Silva – chair of Sri Lanka history at the University of Ceylon, Peradeniya
 Mohan De Silva – professor of surgery; dean of the Faculty of Medical Sciences at the University of Sri Jayewardenepura
 K. N. O. Dharmadasa – professor, dean of the Faculty of Arts at the University of Peradeniya
 George Dissanaike – professor of physics
 Elagu V. Elaguppillai – professor of physics
 Chitra Fernando – lecturer in linguistics, Macquarie University, Australia
 Brendon Gooneratne – senior lecturer, head of the Department of Parasitology at the University of Ceylon, Peradeniya
 Sucharitha Gamlath – professor of Sinhala, dean of the Faculty of Arts at the Jaffna Campus of the University of Sri Lanka
 R. K. W. Goonesekera – professor of law, chancellor of the University of Peradeniya
 Siri Gunasinghe – professor of history
 K. Indrapala – professor of history, dean of the Faculty of Arts at the University of Jaffna
 Osmund Jayaratne – professor of physics
 K. N. Jayatilleke – professor of Pali and Buddhist Studies, head of the Department of Philosophy at the University of Ceylon, Peradeniya
 W. L. Jeyasingham – associate professor of geography, dean of the Faculty of Arts at the University of Jaffna
 Valentine Joseph – professor of mathematics.
 Silan Kadirgamar – lecturer in history and author
 David Kalupahana – professor of philosophy
 P. Kanagasabapathy – professor of mathematics, dean of the Faculty of Science at the Jaffna Campus of the University of Sri Lanka
 R. Kanagasuntheram – professor of anatomy, dean of the Faculty of Medicine at the University of Jaffna
 Y Karunadasa – professor
 Kusuma Karunaratne – professor of Sinhala
 Sam Karunaratne – professor of engineering, vice-chancellor of the University of Moratuwa
 R. Kumaravadivel – professor of physics, dean of the Faculty of Science  at the University of Jaffna
 K. Kunaratnam – professor of physics, vice-chancellor of the University of Jaffna
 Muhammad Ajward Macan Markar – professor of medicine
 M. Nadarajasundaram – professor, dean of the Faculty of Management Studies and Commerce at the University of Jaffna
 Gananath Obeyesekere – professor of anthropology
 S. Pathmanathan – professor of history, chancellor of the University of Jaffna
 Malik Peiris – professor
 V. K. Samaranayake – professor of computer science, dean of the Faculty of Science at the Colombo Campus of the University of Sri Lanka
 S. Selvanayagam – professor of geography, head of the Department of Geography at the University of Jaffna
 K. N. Seneviratne – professor of physiology
 M. Sivasuriya – professor of obstetrics and gynaecology; chancellor of the University of Jaffna
 K. Sivathamby – professor
 Muthucumaraswamy Sornarajah – professor of law, head of the School of Law at the University of Tasmania
 Stanley Jeyaraja Tambiah – professor of anthropology
 A. Thurairajah – professor of civil engineering, vice-chancellor of the University of Jaffna
 A. Veluppillai – professor of Tamil
 S. Vithiananthan – professor of Tamil; vice-chancellor of the University of Jaffna
 Chandra Wickramasinghe – professor of astrobiology; director of the Buckingham Centre for Astrobiology at the University of Buckingham
 Sunitha Wickramasinghe – professor of haematology
 Stanley Wijesundera – professor of chemistry; vice-chancellor of the University of Colombo
 Sumedha Chandana Wirasinghe – professor

Arts
 Gunadasa Amarasekara – author
 Nihal De Silva – novelist
 Vasantha Obeysekera – film director
 Iranganie Serasinghe – actress
 Ambalavaner Sivanandan – novelist

Business and finance
 Eastman Narangoda -  Chairman of Seylan Bank
 J. M. Rajaratnam - Vice President of Singer Company

Civil service

 Austin Fernando - permanent secretary, Governor of Eastern Province
 Gamini Iriyagolla – civil servant
 Nihal Jayawickrama – permanent secretary at the Ministry of Justice
 Jayantha Kelegama – permanent secretary at the Ministry of External and Internal Trade
 K. C. Logeswaran – permanent secretary at the Ministry of Posts, Telecommunications and the Media, District Secretary for Vavuniya District, ambassador to South Korea
 H. M. G. S. Palihakkara - permanent secretary, ambassador, Governor of Northern Province
 V. M. Panchalingam – District Secretary for Jaffna District
 M. J. Perera – permanent secretary at the Ministry of Education and Cultural Affairs, chairman of the Sri Lanka Rupavahini Corporation
 Ranji Salgado – civil servant
 Nihal Seneviratne – Secretary General of Parliament
 Bernard Tilakaratna – permanent secretary at the Ministry of Foreign Affairs
 Lalith Weeratunga – permanent secretary to the President of Sri Lanka
 Wickrema Weerasooria – permanent secretary to the Ministry of Plan Implementation; high commissioner; associate professor of law
 Wilhelm Woutersz – permanent secretary at the Ministry of Foreign Affairs

Diplomacy
 Susantha De Alwis – ambassador
 John De Saram – diplomat
 Yogendra Duraiswamy – diplomat, District Secretary for Jaffna District
 Ahmed Aflal Jawad – ambassador
 Palitha Kohona – diplomat
 Vernon Mendis – ambassador
 A. T. Moorthy – diplomat
 Nimalasiri Silva – diplomat and civil servant

Entertainment

Government and politics

 Sarath Amunugama – government minister
 Felix Dias Bandaranaike – government minister
 Ronnie de Mel – government minister
 Amarasiri Dodangoda – government minister
 K. Ganeshalingam – Mayor of Colombo
 Lakshman Kadirgamar – Minister of Foreign Affairs
 Vikramabahu Karunaratne – politician
 M. A. Abdul Majeed – deputy minister
 G. L. Peiris – government minister
 K. Thurairatnam – Member of Parliament for Point Pedro
 Tissa Vitharana – government minister
 Ranil Wickremasinghe – Prime Minister
 Nissanka Wijeyeratne – government minister

Journalism and media
 Mervyn de Silva – editor of The Times of Ceylon, Ceylon Daily News and Lanka Guardian
 Vijita Fernando – journalist
 K. Kailasapathy – editor of Thinakaran, president of the Jaffna Campus of the University of Sri Lanka
 R. Sivagurunathan – editor of Thinakaran

Law

 Ranjit Abeysuriya – Director of Public Prosecutions
 John De Saram – Director of the Office of the Legal Counsel, United Nations Office of Legal Affairs
 H. L. de Silva – lawyer, ambassador
 Basil Fernando – lawyer
 Mark Fernando – Supreme Court judge
 Saleem Marsoof – Supreme Court judge
 Shiva Pasupati – Attorney General
 Satchi Ponnambalam – Puisne Justice of the Supreme Court of Belize
 H. D. Thambiah – Chief Justice
 Neelan Tiruchelvam – lawyer, academic and Member of Parliament for National List
 C. V. Vigneswaran – Supreme Court judge, chief minister of the Northern Province
 Upawansa Yapa – Solicitor General

Medicine

 Surendra Ramachandran – consultant physician, nephrologist

Military

 Sepala Attygalle – Commander of the Army
 Janaka Perera – Chief of Staff of the Sri Lanka Army
 Chelliah Thurairaja – Colonel Commandant of the Sri Lanka Army Medical Corps

Religion
 Bastiampillai Deogupillai – Roman Catholic Bishop of Jaffna
 S. J. Emmanuel – Roman Catholic Vicar General of the Jaffna Diocese, president of the Global Tamil Forum
 S. Jebanesan – Church of South India Bishop of Jaffna
 Lakshman Wickremasinghe – Anglican Bishop of Kurunegala

Sports
 Hemasiri Fernando – rifle shooter, vice president of the Commonwealth Games Federation
 P. H. D. Waidyatilleka – Vice President of the Athletic Association of Sri Lanka

Other

 Gamani Corea – Secretary-General of the United Nations Conference on Trade and Development
 Cyril Herath – Inspector General of Police
 Rajan Hoole – human rights activist and lecturer in mathematics
 Nandasiri Jasentuliyana – Director of the United Nations Office for Outer Space Affairs
 A. M. Mubarak – Director of the National Science Foundation
 Rudra Rajasingham – Inspector General of Police
 Ana Seneviratne – Inspector General of Police
 T. Somasekaram – Surveyor General
 Kanagaratnam Sriskandan – civil engineer
 Bala Tampoe – general secretary of the Ceylon Mercantile Union
 P. H. D. Waidyatilleka – civil engineer; senior vice president of the Athletic Association of Sri Lanka

Notes

References

 

Ceylon
 
People from British Ceylon